Ramón Ulises Flores Aguirre (born August 21, 1982) is a Salvadoran former footballer who played as a right-back. He was banned for life in 2013, for match-fixing while playing for the El Salvador national football team.

Club career
Flores was born in Santa Ana. After having spent well over a decade with the FAS institution, he left in 2010 to join Once Municipal, a club that had just been promoted before he signed a one-year contract. He rejoined FAS however for the 2011 Clausura.

International career
Flores received his first call up to the senior national team in January 2008. He officially received his first cap on January 22, 2008 in a friendly match against Belize. Flores represented his country in 6 2010 FIFA World Cup qualifying games, in which he played a few games under Mexican coach Carlos de los Cobos.

On September 20, 2013, Flores was one of 14 Salvadoran players banned for life due to their involvement with match fixing.

References

External links
 

1982 births
Living people
Sportspeople from Santa Ana, El Salvador
Association football defenders
Salvadoran footballers
El Salvador international footballers
C.D. FAS footballers
Once Municipal footballers
C.D. Juventud Independiente players
Match fixers
Sportspeople banned for life
Association football controversies